The list of songs written and performed by David Cook comprises original songs recorded by American singer-songwriter David Cook for his studio albums, cover versions of songs by other artists performed by Cook, and original songs written by Cook that were recorded and released by other artists.

Original songs
David Cook's original songs include those written and/or recorded by Cook and released on a studio album or on a single album. Cook has released four studio albums and 14 singles.

Unreleased original songs
Many songs written, recorded, and performed by David Cook have never been released. Many of these have been registered with professional music and copyright bodies, including the American Society of Composers, Authors and Publishers (ASCAP), the Broadcast Music Incorporated (BMI) and Warner/Chappell Music. Several have also been acknowledged and discussed by Cook in interviews, or by other sources.

Cover songs and featured performances
David Cook has covered a number of songs during his career. Because Cook has performed some of the covers several times, the year listed for each is the year in which he first performed or released it.

Original songs performed by other artists
Cook has written several songs, but only a few are recorded by other artists. The track "No Reply" was written and originally intended to be featured in Cook's self-titled debut album, but the track was later sent to Frankie Negrón and was recorded and released as a single in 2010, where the track was later included in the album Independence Day.

In 2014, Cook wrote the track "Kiss You Tonight", along with writers Jay Knowles and Trent Summer, for country artist David Nail, which was released as the second single for the album I'm a Fire. This was the third song Cook wrote for himself after relocating to Nashville in 2012, but he felt that the song didn't suit him. Summer recorded the demo and was sent to Joe Fisher at UMG who put it on hold for David Nail.

References